The 69th World Science Fiction Convention (Worldcon), also known as Renovation, was held on 17–21 August 2011 at the Reno-Sparks Convention Center (RSCC) in Reno, Nevada, United States. The Atlantis Casino Resort served as the headquarters/party hotel, with additional rooms supplied by the Peppermill Reno and Courtyard by Marriott.

The convention committee was chaired by Patty Wells.

Participants

Guests of Honor 

 Tim Powers
 Ellen Asher
 Boris Vallejo
 the late Charles N. Brown, whose contribution was still honored

Special Guests 

 Tricky Pixie
 Bill Willingham

Other notable participants 

 author George R. R. Martin
 radio legend Dr. Demento
 artist Julie Bell

Programming and events 

The Masquerade and the Hugo Awards ceremony were held at the Peppermill. Most other events took place at the RSCC.

Special events included:
 the Renovation Independent/Fan Film Festival 2011
 Music Night on Wednesday
 an Art Night festival celebrating the visual arts in SF on Thursday

The Masquerade was held on Friday the 19th.

Awards

2011 Hugo Awards 

The results were based on the 2100 valid ballots submitted by current members of the World Science Fiction Society. The 2011 Hugo Award statue base was designed by Marina Gelineau.

The awards were presented on Saturday, 20 August.

 Best Novel: Blackout/All Clear by Connie Willis
 Best Novella: The Lifecycle of Software Objects by Ted Chiang
 Best Novelette: "The Emperor of Mars" by Allen Steele
 Best Short Story: "For Want of a Nail" by Mary Robinette Kowal
 Best Related Work: Chicks Dig Time Lords: A Celebration of Doctor Who by the Women Who Love It by Lynne M. Thomas and Tara O'Shea (Mad Norwegian Press)
 Best Graphic Story: Girl Genius, Volume 10: Agatha Heterodyne and the Guardian Muse, written by Phil Foglio and Kaja Foglio, art by Phil Foglio, colors by Cheyenne Wright
 Best Dramatic Presentation, Long Form: Inception, screenplay by Christopher Nolan; story by Christopher Nolan; directed by Christopher Nolan (Warner Bros.)
 Best Dramatic Presentation, Short Form: Doctor Who, "The Pandorica Opens"/"The Big Bang", screenplay by Steven Moffat, directed by Toby Haynes (BBC Cymru Wales)
 Best Professional Editor, Long Form: Lou Anders
 Best Professional Editor, Short Form: Sheila Williams
 Best Professional Artist: Shaun Tan
 Best Semiprozine: Clarkesworld Magazine, edited by Neil Clarke, Sean Wallace, and Cheryl Morgan; podcast directed by Kate Baker
 Best Fanzine: The Drink Tank, edited by Christopher J. Garcia and James Bacon
 Best Fan Writer: Claire Brialey
 Best Fan Artist: Brad W. Foster

Chesley Awards 

The Chesley Awards were presented on 18 August as part of Art Night.

Other awards 

 John W. Campbell Award for Best New Writer: Lev Grossman
 Forrest J Ackerman Big Heart Award: Gay Haldeman

Site selection 

Reno's bid to host the Worldcon was formally unopposed and won with 650 out of the 763 cast ballots at Anticipation in Montréal, Québec in 2009.

Future site selection 

In an uncontested election, the members of the convention selected San Antonio, Texas, as the host city for the 71st World Science Fiction Convention, "LoneStarCon 3", to be held in 2013. With 760 valid ballots cast, Texas received 694 votes, 25 ballots expressed no preference, 14 votes were cast for none of the above, and write-in candidates included Xerpes with 6 votes, Minneapolis with 5, Denton with 5, Boston with 3, plus a number of single-vote entries.

Notes 

A pair of autographed shooting scripts for the HBO television series Game of Thrones were stolen in transit from Belfast to Reno. The theft of the scripts, donated by author George R. R. Martin whose books are the basis for the series and intended for sale at the convention's charity auction, made international headlines. Shipped via registered mail, only the cover letter in a "battered" envelope arrived in Reno. The scripts were signed by executive producers Dan Weiss and David Benioff plus director Alan Taylor.

See also 

 Hugo Award
 Science fiction
 Speculative fiction
 World Science Fiction Society
 Worldcon

References

External links 

 Renovation
 Renovation YouTube channel

2011 conferences
2011 in Nevada
2011 in the United States
Culture of Reno, Nevada
Science fiction conventions in the United States
Worldcon